U-Street All Stars is a Finnish jazz band founded in the fall of 2000. They have released two albums on Blue Note Records.

The letter U in their band name comes from the fact that they rehearse in Uudenmaankatu, Helsinki.

Members

Current members
Markus Holkko – alto sax
Timo Lassy – tenor sax
Teemu Viinikainen – guitar
Ville Herrala – double bass (2004– )
Jussi Lehtonen – drums

Past members
Timo Tuppurainen – double bass (2000–2004)

Releases
Helsinki Sessions (2002)
Bowling (2004)

References

Finnish jazz ensembles
Musical groups established in 2000
2000 establishments in Finland